Bhagvan Singh Kushwaha is an Indian politician and is member of the 18th Uttar Pradesh Assembly and also 16th Legislative Assembly of Uttar Pradesh Legislative Assembly, India. He represented the Kheragarh constituency of Uttar Pradesh and was a member of the Bahujan Samaj Party political party.  In the year 2022 he joined Bharatiya Janata Party and is one of the candidates in Kheragarh Uttar Pradesh Assembly Election 2022.

Early life and  education
Bhagvan Singh Kushwaha was born in Agra district. He attended  the Dr. Bhimrao Ambedkar University and attained Master of Science degree.

Political career
Bhagvan Singh Kushwaha has been a MLA for two terms. He represented the Kheragarh constituency and is a member of the Bahujan Samaj Party political party.

He lost his seat in the 2017 Uttar Pradesh Assembly election to Mahesh Kumar Goyal of the Bharatiya Janata Party.

Posts held

See also
 Kheragarh (Assembly constituency)
 Sixteenth Legislative Assembly of Uttar Pradesh
 Uttar Pradesh Legislative Assembly

References 

Bahujan Samaj Party politicians from Uttar Pradesh
Uttar Pradesh MLAs 2007–2012
Uttar Pradesh MLAs 2012–2017
People from Agra district
1968 births
Living people
Bharatiya Janata Party politicians from Uttar Pradesh
Uttar Pradesh MLAs 2022–2027